The Masonic Temple in Hattiesburg, Mississippi, is a historic building that was designated a Mississippi Landmark in 2003.

Originally constructed as a meeting hall for Hattiesburg Lodge 397, the building was sold when the lodge moved to a new location (on Eatonville Road).  No Masonic lodges currently meet in the building.

References

Former Masonic buildings in Mississippi
Buildings and structures in Hattiesburg, Mississippi
Mississippi Landmarks